No Nonsense may refer to:

 No Nonsense (brand), a brand of intimate apparel and hosiery marketed by Kayser-Roth
 No Nonsense (rapper), American rap artist
 No Nonsense (album), an album by Barbara Mandrell